Eleonora Zrza (22 May 1797 – 1 November 1862), was a Danish opera soprano. She was active at the Royal Danish Theatre in 1816–1845, and was regarded as the one of the leading forces of the Danish opera at the first half of the 19th century.  She was born in Bagsværd.

References 
 Zrza, Eleonore Christine i Carl Frederik Bricka, Dansk Biografisk Leksikon

1797 births
1862 deaths
19th-century Danish women opera singers
People from Gladsaxe Municipality
Singers from Copenhagen